John Guthrie may refer to:

 John Guthrie (bishop of Ross) (died c. 1494), Scottish Roman Catholic bishop
 John Guthrie (bishop of Moray) (died 1649), Church of Scotland bishop
 John Guthrie (cricketer) (1795–1865), English cricketer
 John B. Guthrie (1807–1885), mayor of Pittsburgh, Pennsylvania
 John R. Guthrie (1921–2009), U.S. Army general
 John Guthrie (novelist) (1905–1955), author from New Zealand
 John Guthrie (politician), British political activist
 John Guthrie (basketball coach), former head basketball coach of the Georgia Bulldogs

See also 
 Jack Guthrie (1915–1948), musician